Ek Aur Maut is a Hindi action thriller film of Bollywood directed by K. Khan. It was released on 25 February 2001 under the banner of Shree Parshuram Movies.

Plot

Cast 
 Goga Kapoor
 Raza Murad
 Shiva Rindani
 Anil Saxena
 Madhumati
 Jugraj
 Shahin
 Rakesh Vidua
 Nishi Verma

References

External links
 

2001 films
2001 action thriller films
2000s Hindi-language films
Indian action thriller films
Hindi-language action films